Albert Franklin "Red" Howard (November 23, 1900 – May 29, 1973) was an American football guard who played two seasons in the National Football League, with the Brooklyn Lions and New York Giants. He was also a member of the Brooklyn Horsemen of the American Football League. Howard played college football for the Princeton Tigers.

Amateur career
Howard attended  Haverhill High School in Haverhill, Massachusetts. He first enrolled at New Hampshire College of Agriculture and the Mechanic Arts (which became the University of New Hampshire in 1923) where he was captain of the freshman football team in 1919. He transferred to Princeton University in 1920, where he played for the varsity Tigers football team for the 1922 through 1924 seasons. He also played lacrosse at Princeton, and earned a B.S. degree there in 1925.

Professional career
Brooklyn Horsemen/Lions
Howard played in four games for the Brooklyn Horsemen of the American Football League in 1926. The Horsemen merged with the Brooklyn Lions of the National Football League on November 12, 1926, and he played in three games for the Lions during the 1926 NFL season.

New York Giants
Howard played in one game for the 1927 New York Giants.

Personal life
Howard served in the United States Navy during 1917–1919. In 1923, Howard's father captured a young Bengal tiger while in India on an expedition, and sent it to Princeton as a mascot. Howard was married in 1926.

References

External links
Just Sports Stats

1900 births
1973 deaths
Players of American football from Massachusetts
American football guards
New Hampshire Wildcats football players
Princeton Tigers football players
Brooklyn Horsemen players
Brooklyn Lions players
New York Giants players
Sportspeople from Haverhill, Massachusetts
United States Navy personnel of World War I